Three Sundays to Live is a low budget 1957 film noir British film directed by Ernest Morris and starring Kieron Moore and Jane Griffiths.

The title refers to the law of the period, which required that after a death sentence had been passed, three Sundays must elapse before the execution.

Plot
Young dance band leader, Frank Martin, is condemned to death for a murder he didn't commit. Desperate to prove his innocence, Frank escapes from jail, and with his girlfriend Judy, embarks upon the search for a blonde singer who was used to frame him for the killing. Using a contact who owes Frank a favour, they trace the singer, but the real killer shoots her through a window after she agrees to help them. However, Martin manages to trick the murderer into believing he's killed the wrong woman. When the killer returns to try again, Frank is waiting.

Cast
Frank Martin – 	Kieron Moore
Judy Allen – 	Jane Griffiths
Davitt – 	Basil Dignam
Ruth Chapman – 	Sandra Dorne
Al Murray – 	 Harold Ayer
Detective – 	John Stone
Police Sergeant – 	Norman Mitchell
Warder – 	John Longden
Davis - Ferdy Mayne
The Judge - John Stuart - (uncredited)
Prison Warder - Bill Fraser - (uncredited)
Second Officer - George Roderick - (uncredited)

References

External links

Three Sundays to Live at TCMDB

1957 films
British thriller films
Films shot at New Elstree Studios
1950s English-language films
Films directed by Ernest Morris
1950s British films